Der Sonne entgegen is a German television series.

See also
List of German television series

External links
 

1980s Austrian television series
1985 German television series debuts
1985 German television series endings
1985 Austrian television series debuts
1985 Austrian television series endings
Television shows set in Croatia
German-language television shows
Das Erste original programming